Sincik is a village in the District of Polatlı, Ankara Province, Turkey. In the past, the village was part of the District of Haymana.

Population 
The village is populated by Kurds. In 1940 the village counted 132 inhabitants, consisting of 66 males and 66 females.

References

Villages in Polatlı District

Kurdish settlements in Ankara Province